Royal Air Force Derna or more simply RAF Derna is a former Royal Air Force station located near Derna, Libya.

History

Between April and September 1943, No. 148 Squadron RAF was based there. On 4 November 1943 No. 1586 Flight RAF was formed at RAF Derna.

References

Royal Air Force stations in Africa